Krawarree is a rural locality in Queanbeyan–Palerang Regional Council.

Krawarree is on the Shoalhaven River, and the nearest town is Braidwood, which is about 40 km to the north.

References

Queanbeyan–Palerang Regional Council
Southern Tablelands
Localities in New South Wales
Geography of New South Wales